Vinedale is a historic plantation house located near Pinetops, Edgecombe County, North Carolina. It was built about 1855, and is a two-story, double-pile, three bays wide, Greek Revival / Italianate style frame dwelling.  It features a one-story wraparound porch; a hipped roof with wide, overhanging, flat eaves and a cupola; and curved window heads and brackets.

It was listed on the National Register of Historic Places in 1982.

References

Plantation houses in North Carolina
Houses on the National Register of Historic Places in North Carolina
Greek Revival houses in North Carolina
Italianate architecture in North Carolina
Houses completed in 1855
Houses in Edgecombe County, North Carolina
National Register of Historic Places in Edgecombe County, North Carolina